Wilma Pastrana Jiménez (born January 17, 1970) is a certified public accountant and wife of the former governor of Puerto Rico, Alejandro García Padilla. Pastrana  became the 13th First Lady of Puerto Rico on January 2, 2013, and took on programs to improve child education, health, and welfare on the island.

Biography
Wilma Pastrana Jiménez was born in San Juan, Puerto Rico. She grew up in Río Piedras and graduated with honors from the Colegio Nuestra Señora del Pilar. She earned a Bachelor of Business Administration from Boston University before returning to Puerto Rico and obtaining a CPA license.

Pastrana married Alejandro García Padilla on April 7, 2001. They have three children: Ana, Juan Pablo, and Diego.

Jiménez worked with businesses and organizations such as Deloitte & Touche, GlaxoSmithKline, Panell Kerr and Foster, as well as the Puerto Rico Convention Center and the Tourism Company, continuing even after she became first lady. When her husband won the Governorship of the Island, Jiménez took on additional roles, including initiatives to reduce the dropout rate and spur educational development, to combat childhood obesity and improve health to provide safe spaces and developmental opportunities for children living with disabilities, to teach nutrition and gardening skills throughout the country and several other social service programs to build community.

References

1970 births
Living people
First Ladies and Gentlemen of Puerto Rico
Puerto Rican accountants
Boston University School of Management alumni
Women accountants
20th-century American businesspeople
21st-century American businesswomen
21st-century American businesspeople
20th-century American businesswomen